Julián Casanova (born February 1, 1984) is an Argentine ski mountaineer, mountain climber and UIAGM mountain guide.

He climbed most of the mythical patagonian peaks as Fitz Roy, Cerro Torre and Torres del Paine.

In 2009, he placed third at the South American Ski Mountaineering Championship.

References

External links 
 Leonardo Proverbio at SkiMountaineering.org

1984 births
Living people
Argentine male ski mountaineers
Argentine mountain climbers
Mountain guides
People from Neuquén Province